John III, Count of Nassau-Saarbrücken (5 April 1511 – 23 November 1574) was a son of Count John Louis of Nassau-Saarbrücken and his second wife Catherine of Moers.  He succeeded his childless brother Philip II in 1554 as Count of Nassau-Saarbrücken.  He married Adelaide of Kronenkracht and Elisabeth Selz.  However, his children predeceased him.  When he died in 1574, Nassau-Saarbrücken fell to Nassau-Weilburg.

House of Nassau
Counts of Nassau
1511 births
1574 deaths
16th-century German people
Burials at Stiftskirche Sankt Arnual (Saarbrücken)
Military personnel of the Holy Roman Empire